Kuarup is a 1989 Brazilian drama film directed by Ruy Guerra. It was filmed at the Xingu National Park, Mato Grosso, and in Recife, Pernambuco.

Cast
 Taumaturgo Ferreira as Nando
 Fernanda Torres as Francisca
 Cláudio Mamberti as Ramiro
 Umberto Magnani as Fontoura
 Ewerton de Castro
 Roberto Bonfim
 Cláudia Raia as Sônia
 Rui Resende as Hosana
 Dionísio Azevedo as D. Anselmo
 Cláudia Ohana as Vanda
 Maitê Proença as Maureen
 Lucélia Santos as Lídia
 Ruy Polanah as Manoel Tropeiro
 Cláudio Ferrario as Vidigal
 Mauro Mendonça as Gouveia, minister
 Stênio Garcia as Colonel Ibiratinga
 Maurício Mattar as Levindo

Reception
Kuarup received three special awards at the 15th Festival de Cine Iberoamericano de Huelva. It was entered into the 1989 Cannes Film Festival.

References

External links

1989 drama films
1989 films
1980s Portuguese-language films
Brazilian drama films
Films directed by Ruy Guerra
Films shot in Mato Grosso
Films shot in Recife